Clark is an unincorporated community and U.S. Post Office in Routt County, Colorado, United States.  The Clark Post Office has the ZIP Code 80428.

Geography
Clark is located at  (40.707255,-106.918752).

See also

References

External links

Unincorporated communities in Routt County, Colorado
Unincorporated communities in Colorado